Aamer Farooq (born 26 April 1969) is a Pakistani jurist who is currently serving as an Chief Justice of Islamabad High Court since 11 November 2022 and also been Justice of the Islamabad High Court from 31 December 2014 to 10 November 2022.

Early life and education 
Aamer received his Senior Cambridge diploma from St. Anthony's High School in Lahore in 1986 and his higher senior cambridge diploma from Aitchison College in 1988. In 1993, he graduated from Lincoln's Inn Law School in London with an LLB degree from London University in the United Kingdom.

Judicial career 
Farooq started his practice in Lahore and also has an office in Islamabad. He focuses on civil, commercial, tax, and banking law. He served as adjunct faculty at Lahore University of Management Sciences from 2009 until his promotion in Lahore High Court. Aamer took his oath on January 1, 2015, and on December 23, 2015, he was confirmed as a judge of the Islamabad High Court.

Appointment as CJ IHC 
On 1 November 2022, the Judicial Commission of Pakistan (JCP) suggested that Justice Aamer be named Chief Justice of the Islamabad High Court. President Alvi approved Justice Aamer Farooq’s appointment as the IHC chief justice after the recommendations of parliamentary committee for judges appointment. The committee had on November 4 approved the Judicial Commission of Pakistan’s recommendations for the promotion of Justice Athar Minallah to the SC and Justice Farooq as the IHC chief justice, respectively. |url=https://www.dawn.com/news/1719948 |access-date=2022-11-09 |website=DAWN.COM |language=en}}</ref>

References 

1969 births
Living people
Judges of the Islamabad High Court
Pakistani judges